Rohini Chowdhury (born 1963) is a children's writer and literary translator. Her published writing for children is in both Hindi and English, and includes translations, novels, short stories, and non-fiction. Her children's books and short stories have been shortlisted for awards, including the Hindu Young World Goodbooks Non-fiction Award  and the New Writer Prose and Poetry Competition, 2001, UK.

As a literary translator, she works mainly in Hindi (pre-modern and modern) and English. She has translated the 17th century Braj Bhasha text, Ardhakathanak, considered the first autobiography in an Indian language, into modern Hindi and English. Her most recent translation is that of Tulsidas's Ramcharitmanas, which was published by Penguin India in December, 2019. A short extract from the first volume had earlier been published with the permission of the publisher in the translation journal, Modern Poetry in Translation, Songs of the Shattered Throat, 2017, Number 1.

Biography

Chowdhury was born in Calcutta, India, in 1963. After completing her schooling from Loreto House, she joined Jadavpur University in Calcutta, graduating with a BA (Hons) in Economics. She then decided to pursue a business degree at the Indian Institute of Management, Ahmedabad, graduating from there in 1986 with a PGDM. After several years in business consulting and strategy, she  became a full-time writer. In 1997, she moved to London, where she lives with her two daughters.

Published works

Chowdhury has published the following literary translations:

 Ardhakathanak, by Banarasidas, Penguin Books, 2007
 Ardhakathanak (A Half Story), by Banarasidas; Preface by Rupert Snell; Penguin Books, 2009
 Tyagpatra (The Resignation), by Jainendra; Afterword by Mridula Garg; Penguin Books, 2012
 My Favourite Stories: Bosky’s Panchatantra, by Gulzar; Red Turtle Books, Rupa Publications, India, June 2013
 Chandrakanta, by Devaki Nandan Khatri; Rupa Publications, India, 2015
 Panchatantra, by Vishnusharma; Puffin India, 2017
The Ramcharitmanas, by Tulsidas; Penguin Books, 2019 (in three volumes)
Tales from the Kathasaritsagara, by Somadeva; Puffin India, 2019

She has also published the following children's books:

 Meera's First Day in School; English Edition Publishers, 2002
 Meera and Meena go to the Zoo; English Edition Publishers, 2002
 Meera Gets Lost; English Edition Publishers, 2002
 Meera Goes Shopping; English Edition Publishers, 2002
 Meera and the Surprise Pet; English Edition Publishers, 2002
 Rohini's Book of Meera Stories; English Edition Publishers, 2002 (Omnibus volume, with stories 1 to 6)
 Hari's Train Journey; English Edition Publishers, 2002
 Hari is Bored; Amazon Kindle, 2004
 Meera at the Puppet Show; Amazon Kindle, 2004
 A Very Special Birthday; Amazon Kindle, 2004
 Meera Goes Swimming; Amazon Kindle, 2004
 Meera Goes to the Dentist; Amazon Kindle, 2004
 Meena Goes Away; Amazon Kindle, 2004
 The Crow and the Eagle, illustrated by Taposhi Ghoshal; Scholastic India, 2006
 The Frog and the Ox, illustrated by Sonal Panse; Scholastic India, 2006
 The Foolish Crow, illustrated by Neeta Gangopadhyaya; Scholastic India, 2006
 The Donkey and the Load of Salt, illustrated by Shilpa Ranade; Scholastic India, 2006
 Aesop's Fables; Scholastic India, 2007 (Omnibus volume)
 कौआ चला चील बनने, चित्रांकन तापोशी घोशाल; Scholastic India, 2006
 मेंढक और बैल की कहानी, चित्रांकन सोनल पानसे, Scholastic India, 2006
 मूर्ख कौआ, चित्रांकन नीता गंगोपाध्याय, Scholastic India, 2006
 फेरीवाले का गधा, चित्रांकन शिल्पा रानडे, Scholastic India, 2006
 White Tiger; Puffin, Penguin Books India, 2006
 Gautam Buddha: The Lord of Wisdom; Puffin Lives, Penguin Books India, 2011
 Mathemagic Book 1: Numbers, Numbers Everywhere; Puffin, Penguin Books India, 2012
 Mathemagic Book 2: The Most Powerful Number of Them All; Puffin, Penguin Books India, 2013
 The Garden of the Djinn; Rupa Publications, India, 2013
 Verghese Kurien: The Milkman of India; Scholastic Great Lives, Scholastic India, 2014
 Sachin Tendulkar: The Little Master; Scholastic Great Lives, Scholastic India, 2015

She has co-edited the following anthology of short stories with South African writer, Zukiswa Wanner:

 Behind The Shadows: Contemporary Stories from Africa and Asia, 2012

Film Script

 Granny’s Monster Machines, April 2013, a bilingual Bengali-English film, created in association with Pop Up Festival of Stories and Chocolate Films. The film is available on Youtube.

References

External links
Story website

Living people
1963 births
Jadavpur University alumni
Indian Institute of Management Ahmedabad alumni
Writers from Kolkata